This is a list of programs broadcast by TVO, an English-language provincial educational television station, operated by the Ontario Educational Communications Authority, a crown corporation owned by the Government of Ontario.

Current programming

Children's programming (TVOKids)

Public affairs programming
 The Agenda with Steve Paikin
 Legislative Assembly of Ontario Question Period (from the Ontario Parliament Network)
 Political Blind Date

Cultural programming
 Employable Me
 Great Blue Wild (2019)
 Human Plus
 The Life-Sized City
 National Geographic
 NFB Shorts
 Striking Balance
 The Water Brothers

Scripted programming

Drama series
 Heartbeat

Movie presentations
 Sunday Family Movie

Former programming

 Allan Gregg in Conversation with...
 Almost Home
 Ancient Civilizations
 Antiques Roadshow
 Art's Place
 Arts Alive
 The Ascent of Man
 Blackadder
 Borgen
 Brilliant Creatures
 Building Big
 Canada: The Great Experiment
 Canada: A People's History
 Chances Are, The Science of Luck
 Check and Mate
 Chef!
 Communiqué Agenda
 Concepts in Mathematics
 Concepts in Science
 Cope
 The Corporation
 The Darling Buds of May
 Degrees of Error
 Diplomatic Immunity with Steve Paikin
 Doctor Who
 Down to Earth
 Dying at Grace
 Eco Engineering
 The Education of Mike McManus
 Explorations in Shaw
 Explorations in the Novel
 Film 101
 Fitness Over Forty
 For the Record
 Four for Adventure
 Fourth Reading
 Fragile Nature
 Full Circle with Michael Palin
 The Future
 Geography Skills
 Globe Trekker
 Going Global
 Golden Pennies
 Great Canadian Parks
 Great Canadian Rivers
 Great Migrations
 Green Heroes
 The Greenbelt
 Habitat
 Half a Handy Hour
 Hard Rock Medical
 He Knew He Was Right
 History Bites
 A History of Britain
 How the Earth Changed History
 Human Edge
 Imprint
 In Other Words
 Information Processing
 The Interviews
 In Search of...
 Into the Wild
 It's a Living
 It's Your Move
 Le jardin des sensations
 Joanna Lumley's Greek Odyssey
 Journeys
 Kay's Basic Cooking
 Keep On Moving!
 A Kind of Childhood
 Landmarks
 Landscape of Geometry
 Legends of the World
 Lemur Street
 The Life of Mammals
 The Long Chase
 Look Up
 Magic Shadows
 Many Voices
 Masterworks
 Me and My Inner World
 Medium Close Up
 Microbes and Men
 The Middle East
 Midsomer Murders
 A Million Ways to Move
 Mission Top Secret
 Monarch of the Glen
 More to Life
 Moving On
 Nature Watch Digest
 New Tricks
 Nightmusic Concert
 North America: Growth of a Continent
 Not Another Science Show
 Occupied
 The Omega Factor
 On the Move
 Ontario Scene
 Ontario Spelling Bee Championship
 Outreach Ontario
 Paperweight
 People and Pets
 Person 2 Person with Paula Todd
 Perspectives
 Pins and Needles
 The Prisoner
 Prisoners of Gravity
 Profiles of Nature
 Queen's Park This Week
 Question & Answer
 Realities
 Recreating Eden
 The Royal
 Runaway Bay
 Saturday Night at the Movies (1974–2013)
 Saying Goodbye (1990)
 The Secret Railroad
 See, Hear!
 Self Incorporated
 The Shuttle Years
 Sociology
 Speaking Out
 Studio 2
 Supersense
 Sweatin' It
 Take a Look
 Tell Me a Story
 The Thin Blue Line
 Time Team
 Trial and Retribution
 Two Fat Ladies
 Undersea Explorer
 Understanding Human Behavior
 Understanding the Earth (1975, rebroadcast 1986)
 Victorians
 The View from Here
 Vista
 Vista Presents
 Waste Not
 What's in a Name?
 Wild Animals of the World
 Witness to Yesterday
 Words Come Alive
 World of Nature
 World Religions
 Writing the News

Children's programming (pre-1994)

Original series

 Acme School of Stuff (1988–97)
 The Adventures of Dudley the Dragon (1993–2000)
 The Adventures of Timothy Pilgrim (1975–1982; 1984–92)
 Almost Home (1972–80)
 Artscape (1983–93)
 Ballet Shoes (1977–81; 1983–93)
 Bioscope (1983–87; 1990)
 Bits and Bytes (1984–90; 1993–97)
 The Body Works (1979–91)
 Bookmice (1992–99)
 Calling All Safety Scouts (1983–91)
 Cucumber (1975–91)
 Dear Aunt Agnes (1986–93)
 Eureka! (1981–89)
 F.R.O.G. (1992–95)
 Green Earth Club (1990–95)
 Guess What? (1973–84)
 Here's How! (1991–97)
 It's Your World (1984–93)
 Join In! (1989–97; 1999)
 Let's All Sing (1974–93)
 Magee and Company (1975–80)
 The Magic Library (1989–97)
 Mathica's Mathshop (1993–97)
 Mathmakers (1978–89)
 Math Patrol (1977–95)
 Measure Metric (1977–84)
 Music Box (1982–91)
 Parlez-moi (1978–93)
 Polka Dot Door (1971–2004)
 Polka Dot Shorts (1993–2008)
 Read All About It! (1979–97)
 Readalong (1976–97)
 Report Canada (1978–94)
 Report Metric (1973–78)
 Return to the Magic Library (1990–97)
 The Riddle of Wizard's Oak (1990–97)
 Rigolecole (1992–96)
 The Science Alliance (1982–93; 1995)
 Téléfrançais (1985–96)
 Today's Special (1981–93; 1995–99)
 Two Plus You! (1976–88; 1991–93)
 We Live Next Door (1982–92)
 What If... (1979)
 World of B.J. Vibes (1973–84)
 Write On (1977–86)
 Write Stuff (1987–92)
 You Can Write Anything! (1984–93)
 Zardip's Search for Healthy Wellness (1988–95)

Acquired series

 The Adventures of Black Beauty (1984–94)
 The Adventures of the Little Prince (1983–92)
 Alice in Wonderland (1990–94)
 All About You (1976–93)
 Bagpuss (1992–93)
 Barbapapa (1977–86)
 Belle and Sebastian (1984–90)
 Big Blue Marble (1976–83)
 The Book Bird (1980–87)
 Books from Cover to Cover (1988–93)
 The Bubblies (1984–89)
 The Bush Baby (1993–95)
 Chorlton and the Wheelies (1982–89)
 Cogs Hollow (1992)
 Cover to Cover (1972–80)
 Creepy Crawlies (1991–93)
 Doctor Snuggles (1981–90)
 Don't Ask Me (1976–81)
 Dragons, Wagons & Wax (1978–80)
 Edward and Friends (1988–89)
 The Electric Company (1975–80)
 Eric's World (1992–99)
 Eureeka's Castle (1991–99)
 Fables of the Green Forest (1979–93)
 Fingerbobs (1973–78)
 Fireman Sam (1991–2001)
 Fish Tales (1978–83)
 Flower Stories (1983–86; 1988–90)
 Free to Fly (1987–93)
 Ghostwriter (1992–96; 1998)
 Gran (1986)
 Harriet's Magic Hats (1982–91)
 Hattytown Tales (1976–86)
 High Feather (1980–88)
 How (1972–76)
 Huxley Pig (1992–93)
 Inside/Out (1973–90)
 Iris, The Happy Professor (1992–98)
 It Figures
 Ivor the Engine (1993)
 Jamie and the Magic Torch (1982–89)
 Jeremy the Bear (1975–90)
 Joe (1992)
 Johnson and Friends (1992–2000)
 Kidsbeat (1982–90)
 The Kids of Degrassi Street (1987–91)
 Kitty Cats (1992–98)
 Look and Learn (1971–83)
 Manfred (1992–93)
 The Magic Roundabout (1971–76)
 Math Wise (1982–89)
 Mister Rogers' Neighborhood (1972–89)
 More Books from Cover to Cover (1987–92)
 Moschops (1986–87; 1989)
 Mr Majeika (1992–93)
 The Nargun and the Stars (1990–92)
 New Zoo Revue (1980–83)
 Noddy (1982–83; 1985–88)
 Once Upon a Time... Man (1978–83)
 OWL/TV (1986–89)
 The Ozlets (1987–91)
 Paddington (1982–84; 1992–93)
 The Phoenix and the Carpet (1978–88)
 Pinny's House (1992)
 Pinwheel (1990–93)
 Press Gang (1992–97)
 Robin and Rosie (1982–84)
 Readit with John Roberts (1982–93)
 Sesame Street (1975–90)
 The Secret World of Polly Flint (1989–1990)
 Sharon, Lois & Bram's Elephant Show (1987–2001)
 Simon in the Land of Chalk Drawings (1977–89)
 Spirit Bay (1985–90)
 Storybound (1981–93)
 Tales from the Blue Crystal (1987–91)
 Tales of Magic (1981–89)
 Thinkabout (1979–87)
 Vegetable Soup (1977)
 Vision On (1973–83)
 Widget (1993–97)
 The Wombles (1984–85)

References

Sources 
 TVO programs

 
TVO